Jenifer K Wofford is an American contemporary artist and art educator based in San Francisco, California, United States. Known for her contributions to Filipino-American visual art, Wofford's work often addresses hybridity, authenticity and global culture, frequently from an ironic, humorous perspective. Wofford collaborates with artists Reanne Estrada and Eliza Barrios as the artist group Mail Order Brides/M.O.B. She is also the curator of Galleon Trade, an international art exchange among California, Mexico and the Philippines.

Background 
Wofford was born in San Francisco, and raised in Hong Kong, Dubai, and Kuala Lumpur. Her family returned to California when she was a teenager. With the exception of 2 years in the Czech Republic, Wofford has lived and worked in San Francisco and Oakland for most of her professional life.

While receiving her BFA from the San Francisco Art Institute, Wofford studied with Carlos Villa, whose Worlds In Collision project was of significant influence on her development as an artist and educator. While completing her MFA at UC Berkeley, Wofford worked with Catherine Ceniza Choy, whose book Empire of Care influenced the creation of Wofford's Filipina nurse- related art projects.

Wofford's 2020 mural "Patten Recognition" is on the outside of the Asian Art Museum in San Francisco. Her mural was vandalized in 2021 alongside several cherry blossom trees.

Art
Wofford's visual art, performance art and curatorial projects have been presented in the United States, the Philippines, Malaysia, Turkey and Hong Kong. She has also been awarded artist-in-residence stays in France, the Philippines, Italy, Denmark and Norway. Wofford was awarded a 2017 grant from the Joan Mitchell Foundation.

Other projects include:
Galleon Trade (2007–08): international curatorial project in San Francisco and Metro Manila
 Flor 1973-78 (alternate title: Flor de Manila y San Francisco, 2008): public art project in San Francisco 
 Manananggoogle (as Mail Order Brides/M.O.B.) (2013-ongoing): installation and performance at San Jose Museum of Art, San Jose, Southern Exposure and Somarts Cultural Center, San Francisco
 Earthquake Weather (2014): web project 
 Collapse(2015): painting series at Silverlens Galleries, Makati
Limning the Liminal (2019): Exhibition of drawings, paintings, and artists books at University of San Francisco’s Thacher Gallery
Pattern Recognition (2020): mural outside the Asian Art Museum, San Francisco
Jiayou (2021): artwork displayed in collaboration with artist Christy Chan's project "Dear America"

Teaching
Wofford specializes in Global Perspectives in Contemporary Art at University of California, Berkeley and Filipino American Arts at the University of San Francisco. She has also led numerous studio courses and/or advised graduate students at UC Berkeley, University of San Francisco, California College of the Arts, San Francisco Art Institute, San Francisco State University, Diablo Valley College and Vermont College of Fine Arts since 2007.

References

American performance artists
American contemporary artists
Artists from the San Francisco Bay Area
San Francisco Art Institute alumni
University of California, Berkeley alumni
American artist groups and collectives
American people of Filipino descent
American women artists
Year of birth missing (living people)
Living people
American artists of Asian descent
21st-century American women
Filipino women
Filipino artists
Filipino women artists